Agoseris glauca is a species of flowering plant in the family Asteraceae known by the common names false dandelion, pale agoseris, prairie agoseris, and short-beaked agoseris. It is native to western North America.

Description
Agoseris glauca is a perennial herb which varies in general appearance.

There is no stem, but from May to September the plant flowers in a stemlike inflorescence which is sometimes erect, reaching heights near  or taller. The head is ligulate, bearing many yellow ray florets but no disc florets. The rays may become pinkish with age.

The fruit is an achene with a body up to a centimeter long and a pappus, which may be almost 2 cm in length.

Similar species 
Other species in the genus known as false dandelion or mountain dandelion, as well as true dandelions, can be distinguished from A. glauca by differences in their fruit.

Taxonomy 
Varieties
Agoseris glauca var. dasycephala (Torr. & A. Gray) Jeps.
Agoseris glauca var. glauca

Distribution and habitat
The plant is native to western and northwestern North America from Alaska east to the Northwest Territories and Ontario, southeast to California, Arizona, and New Mexico. It grows in many habitat types, usually those which are non-forested.

Uses
The plant contains a bitter milky juice, which solidifies into a substance when can be chewed as gum; this may have been done by some Plains Indians.

References

External links

Jepson Manual Treatment — Agoseris glauca
USDA Plants Profile for Agoseris glauca
USGS NPWRC Profile
Agoseris glauca — Calphotos Photo gallery, University of California

glauca
Flora of Canada
Flora of the Northwestern United States
Flora of the United States
Flora of the Southwestern United States
Flora of California
Flora of New Mexico
Taxa named by Frederick Traugott Pursh
Plants described in 1813
Flora without expected TNC conservation status